Zhuangyuan, or trạng nguyên in Vietnamese, variously translated into English as principal graduate, primus, or optimus, was the title given to the scholar who achieved the highest score on highest level of the Imperial examination,  (in the Tang dynasty) and  (in the Song dynasty) in ancient China and Vietnam.

In China, Fu Shanxiang is known as the first (and last) female zhuangyuan (nü zhuangyuan) in Chinese history, but under the Taiping Heavenly Kingdom, not the regular imperial exams. After the Taipings captured the city of Nanjing, they offered an exam for women in January 1853 in which Fu attained the highest score. 

In Vietnam, the first trạng nguyên in history was Lê Văn Thịnh, who lived in the Lý dynasty era and was the one who persuaded the Song to give back 6 districts of Quảng Nguyên (today Hà Giang province) to Vietnam. The first female trạng nguyên (nữ trạng nguyên) is Nguyễn Thị Duệ, who later become a consort of the Mạc Emperor Mạc Kính Cung, then a consort of the Lê Emperor Lê Thần Tông, as well as an official of a Trịnh lord after the fall of the Mạc dynasty.

In China
In total, there were 596 zhuangyuan in ancient China.

Noteworthy zhuangyuan
Chen Wenlong
Weng Tonghe
Hong Jun
Fu Shanxiang, Taiping Heavenly Kingdom, the first and only woman to become a zhuangyuan
Mo Xuanqing, was the youngest Zhuangyuan in the imperial examinations during the Tang dynasty
Sun Fujia, (:zh:孫伏伽 (?-658), Tang dynasty dali qing (chamberlain of the Court of Judicial Review), highly regarded for his candid advice to Gaozu and Taizong, the first zhuangyuan in history.
Tang Gao, became the Zhuangyuan in the ninth year (1514) of the Zhengde Emperor's reign during the Ming dynasty
Wen Tianxiang, was a scholar-general in the last years of the Southern Song dynasty. For his resistance to Kublai Khan's invasion of the Song, and for his refusal to yield to the Yuan dynasty despite being captured and tortured
Yu Minzhong, who served as chief grand councilor for part of the reign of the Qianlong Emperor of Qing dynasty.
Lin Hongnian
Zhang Sanjia (:zh:張三甲 (1876–1898), Qing dynasty), the last military zhuangyuan in Chinese history.
Liu Chunlin (:zh:劉春霖 (1872–1942), Qing dynasty), the last zhuangyuan in Chinese history.

In Vietnam 
In total, there were 56 trạng nguyên in ancient Vietnam.

Noteworthy Trạng nguyên
Lê Văn Thịnh, the first trạng nguyên in history.
Huyền Quang, real name Lý Đạo Tái, a politician and later Buddhist monk who lived during the reign of Emperor Trần Nhân Tông during the Trần dynasty. He was considered to be equal with the first six patriarchs of the Zen Buddhist tradition.
Nguyễn Hiền, the youngest to become a trạng nguyên when he was 13 years old, later died at 21 years old. He also many times become an envoy to meet the Yuan dynasty
Mạc Đĩnh Chi (莫挺之,1272–1346) a scholar and envoy who served three emperors of the Trần dynasty, as well as the ancestor of the first emperor of the Mạc dynasty Mạc Thái Tổ
Nguyễn Trực
Phạm Đôn Lễ
Lương Thế Vinh (梁世榮, 1441–1496) a mathematician, buddhist and poet who lived during Emperor Lê Thánh Tông's reign
Nguyễn Bỉnh Khiêm
Nguyễn Thị Duệ, the first and only female trạng nguyên
Nguyễn Đăng Đạo
Trịnh Tuệ
Phan Đình Phùng
Nguyễn Phong Di, the last trạng nguyên in history.

In modern culture 
In modern Chinese, zhuangyuan is used to refer to anyone who achieves the highest mark on a test, or, more generally, to anyone who is at the forefront of his or her field. In mainland China, the term is most often used to refer to the highest score at the provincial level for either the social sciences (文科) or physical sciences (理科) track of the annual gaokao college entrance exam.

See also 
Imperial examination
Confucian court examination system in Vietnam
Jinshi (imperial examination)

Bangyan (Bảng nhãn, 榜眼)

Valedictorian

References

Further reading
 

Confucian education
Confucianism in China
Confucianism in Vietnam
Imperial examination
History of education in China
History of education in Vietnam
History of Imperial China